A piano is a keyboard music instrument. 

Piano may also refer to:

Places
 Piano, Haute-Corse, a commune of the Haute-Corse département on the island of Corsica, France
 Piano di Sorrento, an Italian commune of the Metropolitan City of Naples, Campania
 Piano Vetrale, an Italian hamlet of the Province of Salerno, Campania
 Pianos (club), a live music venue in New York City

People
 Renzo Piano (born 1937), Italian architect

Companies
 Piano (company), an independent film production and distribution company
 Piano Media, a SaaS company specializing in advanced media business processes and online commerce optimization software

Art, entertainment, and media

Anime and television
 Piano (TV series), a South Korean television drama
 Piano: The Melody of a Young Girl's Heart, a 2002 anime series
 The Piano (TV series), a 2023 British televised talent show

Music
 Piano, a dynamic direction in music, often appearing in sheet music as p and indicating that the performer should play softly

Albums
 The Piano (Herbie Hancock album), 1979
 Piano (Wynton Kelly album), 1958
 Piano (George Shearing album), 1989
 A Piano: The Collection, a 2006 five-disc box set by Tori Amos

Songs
 "Piano", a song from Ariana Grande's 2013 album Yours Truly
 "The Piano", a song from PJ Harvey's 2007 album White Chalk

Other art, entertainment and media
 Piano (play), a 1990 stage play 
 "Piano", a 1918 poem by D. H. Lawrence
 The Piano, a 1993 film starring Harvey Keitel, Holly Hunter and Sam Neill
 Piano, an independent film production and distribution company
 Giuoco Piano, a chess opening

Architecture
 Piano rialzato, a mezzanine or raised ground floor, e.g., to defend against acqua alta
 Piano nobile, the principal floor of a large house

See also
Pianist (disambiguation)
Grand Piano (disambiguation)
"Pjanoo", 2008 single by Eric Prydz